"Hey There Lonely Girl" is a song recorded in 1963, titled "Hey There Lonely Boy" in its original version by Ruby and the Romantics. It was a hit both for them and for Eddie  Holman. It has been recorded by many other artists.

Ruby and the Romantics version
The group's original recording was a Top 30 hit, peaking at #27 on the Billboard Hot 100 pop chart. "Hey There Lonely Boy" also reached #5 on Billboard's Middle-road singles chart.

Eddie Holman version
In 1969, R&B singer Eddie Holman recorded and released his own version of the song. It charted in the United States in 1970 and in the United Kingdom in 1974.  Holman's recording of "Hey There Lonely Girl" is most recognizable by its disconsolate, sentimental and heavyhearted lyrics, with his falsetto voice.  Here is a sample of the chorus: 
Hey there lonely girl, lonely girl
Let me make your broken heart like new
Oh, my lonely girl, lonely girl
Don't you know this lonely boy loves you

Holman's song peaked at #2 on the U.S. Billboard Hot 100 pop chart, behind the double A-side single "Thank You (Falettinme Be Mice Elf Agin)"/"Everybody Is a Star" by Sly and the Family Stone. On the US soul singles chart, it went to #4. This version peaked #1 on the Canadian RPM chart and #42 on the Australian chart. Four years after its US/Canadian release, the single went to #4 on the UK Singles Chart, his highest charting single in each country.

Other versions
 Shaun Cassidy's 1977 version was a track on his debut LP.  It reached # 5 in Australia.
Robert John, in 1980, for the album Back on the Street (US #31).
Japanese singer Mariko Tone, on her 1987 cover album For You
Japanese singer Tatsuro Yamashita, on his 1978 live album "It's A Poppin' Time"

See also
 List of 1960s one-hit wonders in the United States

References

1969 singles
1970 singles
Songs about loneliness
Songs with lyrics by Earl Shuman
Songs with music by Leon Carr
Soul songs
Rhythm and blues songs
Ruby & the Romantics songs
Shaun Cassidy songs
Robert John songs
ABC Records singles
1963 songs
RPM Top Singles number-one singles